Aniello Panariello (born 8 October 1988) is an Italian footballer who plays as a centre-back.

Biography
Born in Torre del Greco, the Province of Naples, Panariello started his career at Empoli F.C. Since 2008–09 season he was farmed to Lega Pro clubs in co-ownership deal. In June 2009 he was signed by Pergocrema. but in August loaned to fellow Prima Divisione team Viareggio. On 1 July 2010 he returned to Pergocrema, played 22 times in the league and two more in relegation play-outs, partnering Luca Ricci.

On 1 September 2019, he returned to Paganese.

On 13 August 2020 he signed a 2-year contract with Lucchese.

References

External links
 Pergocrema Profile 
 Football.it Profile 

1988 births
Living people
People from Torre del Greco
Sportspeople from the Province of Naples
Italian footballers
Association football defenders
Empoli F.C. players
A.C. Giacomense players
U.S. Pergolettese 1932 players
F.C. Esperia Viareggio players
U.S. Poggibonsi players
Paganese Calcio 1926 players
S.S. Arezzo players
A.C.N. Siena 1904 players
Serie C players
Serie D players
Footballers from Campania